Leather subculture denotes practices and styles of dress organized around sexual activities that involve leather garments, such as leather jackets, vests, boots, chaps, harnesses, or other items. Wearing leather garments is one way that participants in this culture self-consciously distinguish themselves from mainstream sexual cultures. Many participants associate leather culture with BDSM (Bondage/Discipline, Dominance/Submission, Sado/Masochism, also called "SM" or "S&M") practices and its many subcultures. For some, black leather clothing is an erotic fashion that expresses heightened masculinity or the appropriation of sexual power; love of motorcycles, motorcycle clubs and independence; and/or engagement in sexual kink or leather fetishism.

History

Male leather culture has existed since the late 1940s, when it likely grew out of post-WWII biker culture. Pioneering motorcycle clubs included the Satyrs Motorcycle Club, established in Los Angeles in 1954; Oedipus Motorcycle Club, also established in Los Angeles in 1958, and the New York Motorbike Club. Early San Francisco clubs included the Warlocks and the California Motor Club, while early clubs in Sydney included the South Pacific Motor Club (SPMC).

These clubs reflected a disaffection with the mainstream culture of post-World War II America, a disaffection whose notoriety — and therefore appeal — expanded after the sensationalized news coverage of the Hollister "riot" of 1947. The 1953 film The Wild One, starring Marlon Brando wearing jeans, a T-shirt, a leather jacket, and Muir cap, played on pop-cultural fascination with the Hollister "riot" and promoted an image of masculine independence that resonated with some men who were dissatisfied with mainstream culture. Some butch gays began to imitate Brando by wearing black leather jackets, a black leather cap, black leather boots and jeans and, if they could afford it, by also riding motorcycles. Motorcycle culture also reflected some men's disaffection with the cultures more organized around high culture, popular culture (especially musical theater), and/or camp style. As well, the leather community that emerged from the motorcycle clubs also became the practical and symbolic location for men's open exploration of kink and S&M.

The first gay leather bar in the United States, the Gold Coast, opened in Chicago in 1958, having been founded by Dom Orejudos and Chuck Renslow. South of Market in San Francisco became the hub of the leather subculture in the gay community in 1961 when the Tool Box opened its doors as the first leather bar in the neighborhood. It opened in 1961 at 339 4th St and closed in 1971. It was a gay bar frequented by gay motorcycle clubs. It was made famous by the June 1964 Paul Welch Life article entitled "Homosexuality In America," the first time a national publication reported on gay issues. Lifes photographer was referred to the Tool Box by Hal Call, who had long worked to dispel the myth that all homosexual men were effeminate. The article opened with a two-page spread of the mural of life size leathermen in the bar, which had been painted by Chuck Arnett in 1962. The article described San Francisco as "The Gay Capital of America" and inspired many gay leathermen to move there. When the Stud, along with Febe's, opened up on Folsom Street in San Francisco in 1966, other gay leather bars and establishments catering to the leather subculture followed creating a foundation for the growing gay leather community. The Stud was also originally a Hells Angels hangout; by 1969 it had become a dance bar for hippies on the margins of the leather scene and had a psychedelic black light mural by Chuck Arnett.

Leather clubs started in Sydney from 1970.

Some bands have used leather culture as part of their image beginning in the 1970s; see § Representations below.

Aspects of leather culture beyond the sartorial can be seen in the 1970 murder mystery novel Cruising, by Jay Green. The novel was the basis for the 1980 movie Cruising,  which depicted aspects of the men's leather subculture for a wider audience.

Drummer is an American magazine targeted at gay men, originally published from 1975 to 1999; during the late 20th century, it was the most successful of the American leather magazines, and sold overseas. The publication had a major impact of spreading gay leather as a lifestyle and masculinity as a gay ideal. The magazine was originally focused on quality writings about leather but gradually changed into more of a photo magazine.

In the 1970s Berlin had a huge leather scene with several leather clubs in the area around Nollendorfplatz. The pornographic films of one of Tom of Finland's models Peter Berlin from Berlin, such as his 1973 film Nights in Black Leather, also reflected and promoted the leather subcultural aesthetic. In 1975 (some say since 1973) Europe's biggest fetish event started, Easter in Berlin Leather Festival, organized annually by Berlin Leder und Fetisch e.V.  Also in Europe younger men combined the aesthetic and exploration of sexual power with the gay skinhead movement and social-fraternal organizations like BLUF, from the late 1970s.

Cynthia Slater's activism for women to be accepted within the gay leather scene in San Francisco during the late 1970s brought her to mainstream attention. Slater persuaded the management of San Francisco's S/M leather club the Catacombs, the most famous fisting club in the world, to open up to lesbians; it was originally a gay men's club. It operated from 1975 to 1981, and reopened at another location from 1982 to 1984. Slater was also an early proponent of S/M safety, and one of the major AIDS activists and educators during the late 1970s. Slater hosted Society of Janus safety demonstrations during the late 1970s, cultivating a space for women within the 'plurality of gay men' already present within the leather/kink/fetish Venn-diagramatic culture.

Pat Califia, who identified as a lesbian at the time, was an activist in the San Francisco leather subculture, and is credited for defining the emergence of lesbian leather subculture. On June 13, 1978, Pat Califia, Gayle Rubin, and sixteen others co-founded Samois, a lesbian-feminist BDSM organization in San Francisco that existed from 1978 to 1983 and was the first lesbian BDSM group in the United States. (More under "Lesbian" below). In recent decades the leather community has been considered a subset of BDSM culture rather than the BDSM community being considered a subset of leather culture. Even so, the most visibly organized SM community related to leather has been a subculture of leather, as evidenced by the American competition known as International Mr. Leather (established 1979), and SM in the UK (established 1981). International Ms. Leather was first held in 1987.

In 1979 the newly formed San Francisco lesbian motorcycle club, Dykes on Bikes, led what was then called the San Francisco Gay Freedom Day Parade for the first time and has done so ever since (since 1994, the event has been called the San Francisco Pride Parade).

Leather and Lace, a woman's leather/BDSM support and social group, was founded in Los Angeles in 1980. The women of Leather and Lace learned the "old guard" traditions from the men of Avatar. Leather and Lace had a code of conduct and a uniform that could only be worn once a member earned the right.

In a review of 48 cases of clinical fetishism in 1983, fetishes included clothing (58.3%), rubber and rubber items (22.9%), footwear (14.6%), body parts (14.6%), leather (10.4%), and soft materials or fabrics (6.3%).

By the mid-1980s, lesbian motorcycle enthusiasts in other cities besides San Francisco began to form motorcycle clubs.

In 1984, the Folsom Street Fair in San Francisco was held for the first time; it is and was the world's largest leather event and showcase for BDSM products and culture.

Jack Fritscher’s short-story collection Corporal in Charge of Taking Care of Captain O'Malley (Gay Sunshine Press, 1984) was the first collection of leather fiction, and the first collection of fiction from Drummer. The title entry Corporal in Charge was the only play published by editor Winston Leyland in the Lambda Literary Award winner Gay Roots: Twenty Years of Gay Sunshine - An Anthology of Gay History, Sex, Politics & Culture (1991).

Competing in the 1986 International Mr. Leather contest inspired Steve Maidhof to organize a conference for members of the growing leather, SM, and fetish community, which would focus on education and political activism. To host this conference, named Living in Leather, Maidhof recruited several friends and leading members of Seattle's leather community including: Cookie Andrews-Hunt, Wayne Gloege, Billy Jefferson, Jan Lyon, George Nelson, and Vik Stump. Together, they formed the National Leather Association (NLA), which officially incorporated in the summer of 1986. In October, they hosted the first Living in Leather (LIL) conference. Adding "International" to its name in 1991, the National Leather Association-International staged "Living in Leather" gatherings until 2002. After a period of decline around the turn of the millennium, NLA-I has become more active again and runs a series of awards for fiction and non-fiction writing.

The leather pride flag was designed by Tony DeBlase. He first presented the design at the International Mister Leather event in Chicago, Illinois, U.S. on 28 May 1989. Initial reaction to the flag was mixed. According to DeBlase's article A Leather Pride Flag,
"Some, particularly on the east coast, reacted positively to the concept, but were quite concerned, some even offended, that I had not involved the community in helping to create the design."

In June 1989 the flag was used by the leather contingent in a Portland, Oregon pride parade, which was its first appearance at a pride parade.

In the 1980s and early 1990s, lesbian leatherwomen were often involved in helping to care for gay leathermen who had been stricken with AIDS.

The Leather Archives and Museum in Chicago was founded in 1991 by Chuck Renslow and Tony DeBlase as a “community archives, library, and museum of Leather, kink, fetish, and BDSM history and culture.”

In 1997 the (American) National Coalition for Sexual Freedom was founded; the NCSF's mission as described on its web page is:

In 2002, an article in The Washington Post publicly highlighted Jack McGeorge’s leadership in the Washington, D.C., leather and BDSM community. McGeorge had made no attempt to conceal his involvement in the BDSM and leather lifestyles; his full name appeared prominently on websites, and he said as much to the Post and other media. He did, however, offer his resignation to Hans Blix, hoping to preserve the credibility of his organization (the U.N. Monitoring, Verification and Inspection Commission, called UNMOVIC) before the weapons inspections in Iraq. Blix refused to accept McGeorge's resignation. Later, Hua Jiang, spokeswoman for U.N. Secretary General Kofi Annan, said that being into BDSM was no more likely to be a cross-cultural problem in the Middle East than any number of other issues.

Mark Leno was the first out leatherman to be a state legislator in the United States; he served in the California State Assembly from 2002 to 2008.

In 2005 Viola Johnson started The Carter/Johnson Library & Collection, a “collection of thousands of books, magazines, posters, art, club and event pins, newspapers, event programs and ephemera showing leather, fetish, S/M erotic history."

In 2009 the Leather Hall of Fame began inducting members.

Leather & Grace, a (now defunct) organization of Unitarian Universalist kinksters, was founded in 2011, and combined a red flaming chalice with the stripes of the leather pride flag for their logo.

The LGBTQ and Leather Cultural District was created in South of Market, San Francisco in 2018. It includes the San Francisco South of Market Leather History Alley, with four works of art, which opened in 2017.

Traditions
Throughout the history of the leather subculture, a variety of traditions have been observed, often diligently. While most or all are based on military protocols and ritual, these traditions varied widely between regions, causing much debate today over which traditions are the original or true traditions, or whether the "romanticized versions of leather history" ever existed at all.

As time has progressed and BDSM has become more mainstream (see below), the traditions of leather have adapted. The first major evolution has become known as "New Leather" or "New Guard". However, even this is the subject of some disagreement, as many noted authors and historians assert that there are little or no substantive differences.

Today, the leather subculture is one of many facets to semi-organized alternative sexuality. Many individuals describe long periods of introspection leading to their choice to identify as "leather". Others do not necessarily associate their leather lifestyle with BDSM, and simply enjoy the sensory experience of leather.

Representations

The more specific aesthetics of men's leather culture drew on sources including military and police uniforms. This influence is particularly evident in the graphical illustrations of leathermen found in the work of Tom of Finland. The pornographic films of one of his models Peter Berlin from Berlin, such as his 1973 film Nights in Black Leather, also reflected and promoted the leather subcultural aesthetic.

Aspects of leather culture beyond the sartorial can be seen in the 1970 murder mystery novel Cruising by Jay Green. The novel was the basis for the 1980 movie Cruising,  which depicted aspects of the men's leather subculture for a wider audience.

A band associated with leather culture is Village People, which began in 1977. According to Jack Fritscher, Jacques Morali drew his inspiration for the four characters of Village People from the gay BDSM leather bar and sex club the Mineshaft's dress code. Glenn Hughes, the original leather biker of the group, frequently attended there. He sported an extravagant horseshoe moustache and wore his trademark leather outfit on and off stage. As he was the band's "biker" and a real-life fanatic, he kept his motorcycle parked inside his home. Eric Anzalone was the Leatherman/Biker of Village People from 1995 to 2017, replacing original member Glenn. However, Glenn continued with management of the band. During his later years, he was known for storming the streets of New York City with his custom Harley-Davidson motorcycle. Glenn, who was also referred to by the masses as "Leatherman", was named on People Magazine's 1979 list of most beautiful people.

Distinct aspects of heavy metal fashion can be credited to various bands, but the band that takes the most credit for revolutionizing the look is Judas Priest, primarily with its singer, Rob Halford, who openly identifies as gay and wears black leather. Halford wore a leather costume on stage as early as 1978 to coincide with the promotion for the Killing Machine (Hell Bent for Leather in the United States) album. In a 1998 interview, Halford described the leather subculture as the inspiration for this look. Shortly after appropriating the leather look, Halford started appearing onstage on a roaring motor bike. Soon, the rest of the band followed.

In the late 1970s many fans of Judas Priest, AC/DC and Meat Loaf began imitating the clothing of leathermen due to the association of such fashions with toughness. Typical heavy metal fashions in the UK, US and Australia included leather battle jackets, combat boots, studded belts, and black leather jackets like the Schott Perfecto.

Freddie Mercury of Queen began incorporating leather into his stage costumes during the band's 1978 News of the World Tour. By their 1979 Jazz Tour, Mercury was wearing a full leather outfit, which he explained was inspired by clubs he frequented. Leather jackets, trousers, and accessories would feature prominently in his wardrobe for the rest of his touring career.

Joan Jett has a leather pride sticker prominently displayed on her guitar.

Subcultures
Today, while some may still use the term strictly in the old-fashioned sense (i.e., the romanticized Old Guard), more than ever the leather subculture in the 21st century represents the activities of several major sub-communities. These include BDSM practitioners, and people who have a preference for aggressive or masculine sexual styles; people who love motorcycles; people involved in kink or leather fetishism; and people who participate in large-scale cultural and marketing events such as Folsom Street Fair or leather-themed circuit parties.

Women
Although gay men are the most visible demographic of the leather community, there are numerous women who identify as leatherwomen – and women have the International Ms. Leather (IMsL) event as their corollary to International Mr. Leather (IML). An example of a leatherwoman is Joan Jett, who has a leather pride sticker prominently displayed on her guitar.

Relatively few lesbian women were visible during the early emergence of the leather subculture. Pat Califia, who identified as a lesbian at the time, was an activist in the San Francisco leather subculture, and is credited for defining the emergence of lesbian leather subculture. On June 13, 1978, Pat Califia, Gayle Rubin, and sixteen others co-founded Samois, a lesbian-feminist BDSM organization in San Francisco that existed from 1978 to 1983 and was the first lesbian BDSM group in the United States. (More under "Lesbian" below) In recent decades the leather community has been considered a subset of BDSM culture rather than a descendant of that culture. Even so, the most visibly organized SM community related to leather has been a subculture of leather, as evidenced by the American competition known as International Mr. Leather (established 1979), and SM in the UK (established 1981). International Ms. Leather was first held in 1987.

In 1979 the newly formed San Francisco lesbian motorcycle club, Dykes on Bikes, led what was then called the San Francisco Gay Freedom Day Parade for the first time and has done so ever since (since 1994, the event has been called the San Francisco Pride Parade).

Leather and Lace, a woman's leather/BDSM support and social group, was founded in Los Angeles in 1980. The women of Leather and Lace learned the "old guard" traditions from the men of Avatar. Leather and Lace had a code of conduct and a uniform that could only be worn once a member earned the right. In New York, there was LSM. Only members of the club were allowed to know that LSM stood for Lesbian Sex Mafia.

By the mid-1980s, lesbian motorcycle enthusiasts in other cities besides San Francisco began to form motorcycle clubs.

In the 1980s and early 1990s, lesbian leatherwomen were often involved in helping to care for gay leathermen who had been stricken with AIDS.

Various age groups
In the United States, men's leather culture has been associated with men above the age of 40, but recent years have seen growing numbers of younger leather men. Also, in much of the rest of the world, including Europe and Australia, there is a merging of the established older leather community with young leathermen and leatherwomen and kink/fetish/gear communities. In Europe, younger men have combined the aesthetic and exploration of sexual power with the gay skinhead movement and social-fraternal organizations like BLUF, from the late 1970s.

Deaf people
In 1986, Baltimore Leather Association of the Deaf (BLADeaf), the first deaf leather club in America, was founded. Its original name was Maryland Lambda Alliance of the Deaf and it had three name changes before its name was changed to BLADeaf. It was founded by Elwood C. Bennett, Scott Wilson, and Harry "Abbe" Woosley, Jr. According to BLADeaf, the fact of the Baltimore Eagle being BLADeaf's home bar means the Baltimore Eagle is the world's first bar to home a deaf leather organization.

In 1989, a deaf chapter of the National Leather Association called “NLA: Deaf Chapter”, which eventually became International Deaf Leather, was founded by Michael Felts, Philip Rubin, Bob Donaldson, Rolf Hagton, Jim Dunne, Bobby Andrascik and Charles Wilkinson. International Deaf Leather held contests for the titles International Ms. Deaf Leather, International Mr. Deaf Leather, and International Deaf Leather Boy. International Deaf Leather also bestowed the Michael Felts Lifetime Achievement Award, which in 1997 was given to Baltimore Leather Association of the Deaf (BLADeaf) cofounder Harry “Abbé” Woosley, Jr., and the International Deaf Leather Recognition Award, which in 1998 was given to Baltimore Leather Association of the Deaf (BLADeaf). International Deaf Leather ended in 2021.

Places and events

Events
The Folsom Street Fair, begun in 1984, is an annual BDSM and leather subculture street fair held in September, that caps San Francisco's "Leather Pride Week". The Folsom Street Fair, sometimes simply referred to as "Folsom", takes place on Folsom Street between 8th and 13th Streets, in San Francisco's South of Market district. The event is California's third-largest single-day, outdoor spectator event and the world's largest leather event and showcase for BDSM products and culture. Folsom Street Events now organizes many events each year including Folsom Europe.

Other large events include Easter in Berlin (the largest leather event in Europe), International Mr. Leather and Mister Leather Europe, and Amsterdam Leather Pride (see Wikipedia article in Dutch).

Archives
Many LGBT museums, archives and libraries collect material relating to leather communities, with many holding substantial collections, including the Australian Queer Archives, and the Leather Archives and Museum, the latter being based in Chicago. In 1991 Chuck Renslow and Tony DeBlase founded the Leather Archives and Museum “as a community archives, library, and museum of Leather, kink, fetish, and BDSM history and culture.” In 2005 Viola Johnson started The Carter-Johnson Leather Library, "a non-profit [501(c)(3) pending] organization that consists of a traveling collection of thousands of books, magazines, posters, art, club and event pins, newspapers, event programs and ephemera showing leather, fetish, S/M erotic history."

Cultural districts
The LGBTQ and Leather Cultural District was created in the South of Market (SoMa) neighborhood of San Francisco in 2018. It includes the San Francisco South of Market Leather History Alley, with four works of art, which opened in 2017:
the four works of art are: A black granite stone etched with a narrative by Gayle Rubin, an image of the "Leather David" statue by Mike Caffee, a reproduction of Chuck Arnett’s 1962 mural that was in the Tool Box (a gay leather bar), engraved standing stones that honor community leather institutions (one being the Folsom Street Fair), leather pride flag pavement markings through which the stones emerge, and bronze bootprints along the curb which honor 28 people who were an important part of the leather communities of San Francisco.

Bars and urban districts

Many major cities around the world had or have legendary leather bars and clubs, and in some cases a concentration of these associated a particular district with the leather scene:
 Amsterdam: the Cockring (now closed) and Eagle bars and Warmoesstraat street — noting the closing of most of the leather bars once here, newspaper Het Parool stated in 2015 that "the darkroom has been consigned to history because of Grindr"
 Berlin: Scheune (bar), Tom's Bar, both on Motzstraße, New Action on Kleiststraße and the area around Nollendorfplatz
 New York City: the Mineshaft bar (now closed) and the Meatpacking District
 San Francisco: the LGBTQ and Leather Cultural District covers the area which traditionally has had a concentration of leather bars and clubs
Mexico City: in the gay-friendly Condesa neighbourhood, Tom's Leather Bar serves special nights for the Mexican leather community since 1995.

Old Guard Leather 

Old Guard Leather is a lifestyle and belief system stemming from Military life and Protocols, that includes elements of tradition, discipline and hierarchy.

History of Old Guard Leather 
The history of Old Guard Leather has its roots in the post-World War II era, when many veterans returned home and formed leather (motorcycle) clubs and organizations. These early leather clubs placed a strong emphasis on protocol and tradition, drawing inspiration from military and fraternal organizations.

The Old Guard Leather community today, after becoming less active and publicly visible during the 90's and the first decade of 2000, is gaining more presence again in opposition to the watering-down of the Leather scene, heavily influenced by commercial agendas of event organizers and social media. Haus Mein Gott is one of the most publicly active Old Guard Leather groups.

See also
 BDSM
 Fetish fashion
 Fetlife
 Hanky code
 Latex clothing
 Leather Archives and Museum
 List of leather events
 National Leather Association International
 PVC clothing
Catsuits and bodysuits in popular media
 Southeast Leatherfest

References

External links

 Leather Archives and Museum Leather History Timeline

 
BDSM
LGBT culture
Fetish subculture
Gay masculinity
Gay male BDSM